Kajang Prison (formerly known as Selangor Central Prison) is a prison located in Sungai Jelok, Selangor, Malaysia.

During the COVID-19 pandemic in Malaysia in early 2022, 18 inmates were suspected of having adverse effects after taking the COVID-19 vaccine, two of whom died as a result.

Notable prisoners
 Michael Denis McAuliffe – executed
Mona Fandey – executed along with her husband and assistant
Ahmad Najib bin Aris – rapist and murderer of Canny Ong, executed on 23 September 2016
Najib Razak – a former Malaysian Prime Minister  who is currently serving a 12 year sentence and a RM210 million fine for 3 counts for criminal breach of trust under Section 409 of the Penal Code 3 counts of money laundering under Section 4(1)(b) of Anti-Money Laundering Act, Anti-Terrorism Financing Act and Proceeds of Unlawful Activities Act and 1 count of abuse of power under Section 23 of the Malaysian Anti-Corruption Commission (MACC) Act 2009 starting 23 August 2022

References

Prisons in Malaysia
Prison
Buildings and structures in Selangor
1985 establishments in Malaysia